Brohug (also stylized as BROHUG), is a Swedish DJ and production trio, consisting of Christopher Lunde, John Dahlbäck and Niklas Lunde.

Background

Coming together as DJs from different shows, Brohug was formed when the three members became friends and collaborated.

In July 2016, their debut single on Tchami's label Confession was released with the title "In the Morning".

In January 2017, Dim Mak released a 2-song EP of Brohug titled Giggle Juice, which is a follow to their previous two works Guerilla and the Marshall EP. Their other EP release on Dim Mak is titled Knuckles. In March, Brohug released a remix of the Alesso song "Falling". In May, they released "If I'm Wrong", a single on Tchami's record label Confession. In June, a song was released by Brohug titled "Ballin" as a free download. In August, Brohug remixed the Martin Garrix song "There For You", which was included in the song's official remix pack. On the 4th of August, they released an EP on Dim Mak Records, titled The Streets. In September, they collaborated with producer Autoerotique for the single "Brains", which was released on Spinnin' Records.

On November 17, 2017, they released the song "Boogieman" on Steve Aoki's label Dim Mak.

On November 25, 2017, they released "Ambush" as a single on the Tiesto label Musical Freedom. In December, they released "Be BROHUG" as a single. It features the vocal sample of "Rock the Party" which was also used in a Jauz song.

Discography

Extended plays
2020
 Mixtape 3

2018
 Swag / Vamos

Singles
2022
 "Obsessed"
 "Diamonds"

2021
 "Keeping up with Brohug"
 "No Ass"
 "Move Like Dolphin"
 "Daybreak"
 "Night Rider"
 "Girls"
 "Burn the House"
 “Fattoush”
 "Chocolate"
 "Do Me Right"

2020
 "Stockholm"
 "24 Hours" (with Ibranovski)
 "Beautiful Monster"
 "Submarine"
 "Orient"
 "Savior"
 "Brake" (with Saint Punk)
 "London Thing" (featuring Newyon)
 "Stealth"
 "Escape"
 "Charge"
 "Breach"
 "Gold On My Crown" (featuring Born I)
 "Click"
 "Amplified"
 "Lost Your Mind"
 "Children"
 "Trouble"
 "Detox"
 "Say My Name"
 "Party Out"
 "Preacher" (with Loge21)
 "1990" (with Kaskade)

2019
 "Keep"
 "Shatter"
 "Ready"
 "Scorpion"
 "Get Down" (with Ghastly)
 "Addict"
 "Datdatdat"
 "Dust"
 "Rush"

2018
 "Fun" (with Kaskade and Mr. Tape)
 "My Place" (with Tchami featuring Reece)
 "Charlie"
 "Be Somebody"
 "The Hunt"
 "In My Hand"

2017
 "Boogieman"

Remixes
2017
Alesso – "Falling"
Rob & Jack – "El Chupacabra"
Martin Garrix and Troye Sivan – "There For You"
Late Night Alumni and Kaskade – "Love Song"
Major Lazer featuring Travis Scott, Camila Cabello and Quavo  – "Know No Better"
Martin Solveig featuring Alma – "All Stars"
Quix featuring Nevve – "Riot Call"

2018
 Luciana and Nytrix - "Trouble"
Danny Avila and The Vamps featuring Machine Gun Kelly - "Too Good To Be True"
Axwell & Ingrosso and Romans - "Dancing Alone"
Sikdope featuring Nevve - "Lost in the Blue"

2019
 Party Favor - "2012"
 Loud Luxury and Anders - "Love No More"
Billie Eilish - "Bury a Friend"
Steve Angello - "Knas"

2020
 Luciana and Nytrix - "Trouble"
 Sidekick - "Get Down"

References

Swedish DJs
Swedish electronic musicians
House music groups
Dim Mak Records artists
Electronic dance music DJs